Milbanke is a surname, and may refer to:

Sir Ralph Milbanke, 5th Baronet (1725-1798), English peer and politician who served as High Sheriff of Yorkshire
Admiral Mark Milbanke (1724-1805), senior British naval officer after whom Milbanke Sound is named
Ada King-Milbanke, 14th Baroness Wentworth (1871–1917), British peer
Sir John Milbanke Huskisson, 8th Baronet (1800-1868), British diplomat and peer
Annabella Milbanke (1792–1860), known as Lady Byron, wife of poet George Gordon Byron
Elizabeth Milbanke (1751–1818), the political hostess Elizabeth Lamb, Viscountess Melbourne, wife of Peniston Lamb, 1st Viscount Melbourne
Sir John Milbanke, 10th Baronet, VC (1872–1915), British Army officer
Noel Anthony Scawen Lytton-Milbanke, 4th Earl of Lytton (1900–1985), known as Noel Lytton, 4th Earl of Lytton,  British Army officer and writer
Ralph King-Milbanke, 2nd Earl of Lovelace (1839–1906), British author of Astarte: A Fragment of Truth concerning the first Lord Byron

Titles 

 Milbanke baronets, a title in the Baronetage of England, created 1661
Milbank baronets, a title in the Baronetage of England created in 1882 for a branch of the same family (spelling variation) 
 Earl of Lovelace, a hereditary title of England

See also

Milbanke Sound, on the coast of the Canadian province of British Columbia, extending east from Queen Charlotte Sound
Milbanke Sound Group, enigmatic group of five small basaltic volcanoes in the Kitimat Ranges of the Coast Mountains in British Columbia, Canada
Milbank (disambiguation)
Millbank (disambiguation)